HMS Darsham was one of 93 Royal Navy ships of the  of inshore minesweepers. Their names were all chosen from villages ending in -ham, in this case after Darsham in Suffolk.

References
Blackman, R.V.B. ed. Jane's Fighting Ships (1953)

 

Ham-class minesweepers
Royal Navy ship names
1952 ships